The qualifying rounds for the 1993 Australian Open were played in early January 1993 at the National Tennis Centre at Flinders Park in Melbourne, Australia.

Seeds

Qualifiers

Lucky losers
  Maya Kidowaki

Draw

First qualifier

Second qualifier

Third qualifier

Fourth qualifier

Fifth qualifier

Sixth qualifier

Seventh qualifier

Eighth qualifier

References

External links
 1993 Australian Open – Women's draws and results at the International Tennis Federation
 Official results archive (WTA)

Women's Singles Qualifying
Australian Open (tennis) by year – Qualifying